Mesosa undulatofasciata is a species of beetle in the family Cerambycidae. It was described by Stephan von Breuning in 1955. It is known from Vietnam.

References

undulatofasciata
Beetles described in 1955